The Transformers: Maximum Dinobots was a story arc from IDW Publishing's The Transformers, and followed The Transformers: All Hail Megatron.

Plot summary

Reviews
Issue #1 ComicList Review: 4/5 
Issue #2 ComicList Review: 4/5
Issue #3 Panels on Pages Review: 3/5
Issue #4 ComicList Review: 3/5
Issue #5 ComicList Review: 4/5

References

External links
IDW Catalogue

Maximum Dinobots